The Cedar Rapids Silver Bullets were a professional basketball team based in Cedar Rapids, Iowa from 1988 to 1991. They played in the Continental Basketball Association (CBA), the defunct development league for the National Basketball Association (NBA).

History

Cincinnati Slammers relocation

The franchise was purchased for an undisclosed amount by Krause Gentle, the parent company of Kum & Go convenience stores. The company announced their intentions to relocate the team to Cedar Rapids, Iowa. The team's 1988-89 schedule was printed on soda cups that were sold at Kum & Go locations. 
 The name "Silver Bullets" was chosen because the team was sponsored by Coors Light, which marketed the "silver bullet can".

Cedar Rapids (1988–1991)
The Silver Bullets played their home games at the 7,200 seat Five Seasons Center (now U.S. Cellular Center). Kevin Krause, whose father owned the team through their parent company Krause Gentle, served as the team's president.

Lewis Lloyd, who was banned from playing in the National Basketball Association (NBA) due to a violation of their drug policy, sought a court injunction in 1988 to allow him to play in the CBA after his contract with the Cedar Rapids Silver Bullets was rejected by CBA commissioner Jay Ramsdell. Lloyd had been participating in the league's rehabilitation program and qualified for reinstatement on March 19. 1989, but through his lawyer challenged the legality of the CBA's drug policy. On December 21, 1988 Linn County, Iowa District Judge William Thomas ruled that the CBA had a right to bar players who had a history of drug use. Ramsdell testified at the hearing that the CBA did not test for cannabis during their drug screenings.

On December 30, 1989, Rockford Lightning head coach Charley Rosen was arrested in Cedar Rapids for assaulting Silver Bullets head coach George Whittaker. Rosen was restrained from attacking Whittaker on the court by referees and ejected from the game. After Cedar Rapids posted a 119–98 victory over the Lightning, Rosen met Whittaker in the hallway outside of the Silver Bullets locker room and struck him in the neck and shoulder. According to the Associated Press, Rosen was angry that Whittaker's team was running up the score. As a result of the altercation, the CBA suspended Rosen eight games and fined him an undisclosed amount. In April 1990, Rosen pleaded guilty to the misdemeanor assault charge.

The 1990 CBA All-Star Game was held in Cedar Rapids, Iowa on January 18. The game was sponsored by LA Gear, who announced on the broadcast that they were the official shoe of the CBA. John Starks appeared in the 1990 CBA All-Star Game as a member of the Silver Bullets. During a game late in the season, Starks pushed a referee which led his suspension from the CBA. Starks would eventually become an NBA All-Star with the New York Knicks in 1994.

Bimm Ridder Sportswear, an athletic apparel manufacturer, got its start making products for the Silver Bullets and the Minor League Baseball team, the Cedar Rapids Reds.

Relocation to Tri-Cities, Washington
In June 1991, the CBA approved the re-location of the Cedar Rapids franchise to Tri-Cities, Washington. The team would later be known as the Tri-City Chinook who played their home games at Tri-Cities Coliseum in Kennewick, Washington.

Season-by-season records

All-time roster

Randy Allen
Anthony Blakley
Boot Bond
Mel Braxton
Brent Carmichael
Ron Cavenall
David Colbert
Tommy Davis
Joel DeBortoli
Calvin Duncan
Pat Durham
Ben Gillery
Terry Gould
Orlando Graham
Steve Grayer
Ken Green
Derrek Hamilton
Chris Harris
Steve Hayes
Darryl Johnson
Byron Larkin
Gary Leonard
Lewis Lloyd
Al Lorenzen
Roy Marble
Anthony Martin
Shawn McDaniel
Jeff Moe
Melvin Newbern
Reggie Owens
Ray Pugh
Jeff Rahilly
Ron Roberts
Ron Rowan
Donald Royal
John Starks
Everette Stephens
Barry Stevens
Peter Thibeaux
Clarence Thompson
Damon Vance
Demone Webster
A. J. Wynder

Sources

Awards
A. J. Wynder — CBA Player of the Week (January 5, 1989)
John Starks — 1990 CBA All-Star and 1990 CBA Slam Dunk Contest runner-up

References

Basketball teams in Iowa
1988 establishments in Iowa
Continental Basketball Association teams
Sports in Cedar Rapids, Iowa
Basketball teams established in 1988
1991 disestablishments in Iowa
Sports clubs disestablished in 1991